Social Indicators Research, founded in 1974, is a journal that publishes research results dealing with the measurement of the quality of life.

Editors
 Editor-in-chief: Filomena Maggino, Sapienza University of Rome, Italy
 SINET selection editor: Kenneth Land Duke University, Durham, North Carolina

Abstracting and indexing 
Social Indicators Research is abstracted and indexed in the Social Sciences Citation Index. According to the Journal Citation Reports, the journal had a 2018 impact factor of 1.703.

It is also indexed in ABI/INFORM, Academic Search, AgeLine, Bibliography of Asian Studies, Business Source, CAB International, Communication Abstracts, Corporate ResourceNet, Criminal Justice Abstracts, CSA/Proquest, Current Abstracts, Current Contents / Social & Behavioral Sciences, Current Index to Statistics, Dietrich's Index Philosophicus, ERIH, Expanded Academic, FRANCIS, Gale, Geobase, Global Health, Google Scholar, International Bibliography of Book Reviews (IBR), International Bibliography of the Social Sciences (IBSS), Journal Citation Reports/Social Sciences Edition, JSTOR, OCLC, PASCAL, PsycINFO, Referativnyi Zhurnal, SCOPUS, Social Science Citation Index, Social SciSearch, SRM Abstracts, Summon by Serial Solutions, The Philosopher's Index and TOC Premier.

Notes

External links
 The Social Indicators Network News
 Book series: Social Indicators Research Series
 Book series: Social Indicators Research Programmes

Sociology journals
Journals published between 13 and 25 times per year